Lauren Christie Glazier (born 1985) is a Canadian-American film and television actress.

Early life and education
Glazier was born and grew up in Kelowna, British Columbia and studied at the Lee Strasberg Theatre and Film Institute and the Vancouver Academy of Dramatic Arts.

Career
Glazier was discovered by Antoine Fuqua in Vancouver and has since appeared on stage in Six Degrees of Fornication with The Whitefire Theatre in 2009, as Isadora Duncan in the Los Angeles premiere of When She Danced in 2010; and in Something Blue with The Whitefire Theatre in 2011.

In TV and film, she appeared in the 2010 TV series Class, the 2009 film Going Back, and the 2010 film Killers, and played a Russian sniper in the 2018 film Red Sparrow. She had a lead role in the 2012 film South Down Orchard. Her breakthrough role was as a fashionista in the 2014 film Gone Girl. 

In 2019, Glazier played a recurring character in Season 2 of Netflix’s crime drama Mindhunter.

She also plays Nyrie in the science fiction drama series See on Apple TV+, which premiered in November 2019.

Filmography

Other works

Model works

References

External links

People from Kelowna
Actresses from British Columbia
Living people
1985 births